Greigia vanhyningii is a plant species in the genus Greigia. This species is endemic to southern Mexico (States of Veracruz, Oaxaca, and Chiapas).

Taxonomy
The species was first described in 1959. The original description spelt the epithet as van-hyningii, but the International Plant Names Index deletes the hyphen.

References

vanhyningii
Endemic flora of Mexico
Plants described in 1959